Tejo Energia is an energy and utility company in Portugal, and one of the largest private sector Portuguese companies by asset value.

It is headquartered in the Paço de Arcos civil parish of Oeiras, in the Lisbon District of Portugal. 

Tejo Energia operated the Pego Power Station til 2021.

See also

References

Energy companies of Portugal
Electric power companies of Portugal
Oeiras, Portugal